Ebou Kanteh (born 12 February 1995) is a Gambian international footballer who plays as a midfielder.

Career
Born in Brikama, he has played club football for Brikama United and Real de Banjul. He spent time in 2019 with Sheikh Jamal Dhanmondi Club.

He made his international debut for Gambia in 2015.

References

1995 births
Living people
Gambian footballers
The Gambia international footballers
Brikama United FC players
Real de Banjul FC players
Sheikh Jamal Dhanmondi Club players
Association football midfielders
Gambian expatriate footballers
Gambian expatriates in Bangladesh
Expatriate footballers in Bangladesh